Digby Johns McLaren,  (11 December 1919 – 8 December 2004) was a Canadian geologist and palaeontologist.

Born in Carrickfergus, Ireland, and educated at Sedbergh School, he received a Bachelor of Arts in geology from the University of Cambridge. During World War II, he fought in the Middle East and Europe with the Royal Regiment of Artillery. After the war, he received a Master of Arts in geology from the University of Cambridge in 1948. In 1948, he moved to Canada and joined the Geological Survey of Canada (GSC). In 1951, he received a Ph.D. from the University of Michigan.

From 1959 to 1967, he was the head of the palaeontology section of the GSC. In 1967, he became the first director of the Institute of Sedimentary and Petroleum Geology of the GSC and in 1973 he was appointed director of the Geological Survey of Canada. In 1981, he became Assistant Deputy Minister of Science and Technology for Energy, Mines and Resources Canada.

He was the author of over 100 publications and maps in the fields of palaeontology, biostratigraphy and regional geology. He was one of the early theorists of the Cretaceous–Paleogene extinction event.

From 1987 to 1990, he was the president of the Royal Society of Canada. He was also president of the Geological Society of America.

In 1942, he married Phyllis Matkin, with whom he had three children: Ian, Patrick, and Alison.

Honours 
In 1968, he was made a Fellow of the Royal Society of Canada. 
In 1979, he was made a Fellow of the Royal Society
In 1979, he was made a Foreign Associate of the U.S. National Academy of Sciences
In 1987, he was awarded the Geological Association of Canada's highest honour, the Logan Medal
In 1987, he was made an Officer of the Order of Canada.
In 1994, he was elected an International member of the American Philosophical Society.

References

 

1919 births
2004 deaths
20th-century Canadian civil servants
20th-century Canadian geologists
Geological Survey of Canada personnel
Logan Medal recipients
Fellows of the Royal Society
Fellows of the Royal Society of Canada
Foreign associates of the National Academy of Sciences
Irish emigrants to Canada (before 1923)
Officers of the Order of Canada
Canadian people of Ulster-Scottish descent
People from Carrickfergus
Royal Artillery officers
People educated at Sedbergh School
University of Michigan alumni
Presidents of the Geological Society of America
British emigrants to Canada
Canadian expatriates in the United States
Members of the American Philosophical Society
Canadian Fellows of the Royal Society